Jackson Township is one of thirteen townships in Washington County, Indiana, United States. As of the 2010 census, its population was 2,116 and it contained 846 housing units.

Geography

Unincorporated towns
 Martinsburg at 
(This list is based on USGS data and may include former settlements.)

Adjacent townships
 Pierce Township (north)
 Polk Township (northeast)
 Wood Township, Clark County (east)
 Greenville Township, Floyd County (southeast)
 Morgan Township, Harrison County (southwest)
 Posey Township (west)
 Howard Township (northwest)

Cemeteries
The township contains four cemeteries: Goss, Hiestand, Martinsburg and Rickerd.

Lakes
 Palmyra Lake

School districts
 East Washington School Corporation

Political districts
 Indiana's 9th congressional district
 State House District 73
 State Senate District 47

References
 United States Census Bureau 2007 TIGER/Line Shapefiles
 United States Board on Geographic Names (GNIS)
 IndianaMap

External links
 Indiana Township Association
 United Township Association of Indiana

Townships in Washington County, Indiana
Townships in Indiana